Jalan Pelabuhan Kuantan, Federal Route 421, is a federal road in Pahang, Malaysia.

Federal Route 421 was built under the JKR R5 road standard, allowing a maximum speed limit of up to 90 km/h.

List of junctions

References

Malaysian Federal Roads